Carlo Di Lanno (born 1993) is an Italian ballet dancer. He is a former Principal Dancer with the San Francisco Ballet and Dresden Semperoper Ballett. He trained and graduated at Accademia Teatro alla Scala, and danced with Teatro alla Scala and Staatsballett Berlin.

Biography 
Carlo started ballet at the age of 9 at Teatro di San Carlo, and at the age of 15 moved to Milan to continue his studies at Accademia Teatro alla Scala. After his graduation, he joined the corps de ballet of Teatro alla Scala and the Staatsballett Berlin. During those years, he danced a variety of soloist and principal roles, including: Sigfried in Swan Lake by Nureyev, Basilio in Don Quixote by Nureyev, the lead role in Diamonds by Balanchine and principal roles in Concerto DSCH and Russian Seasons by Ratmansky and Pink Floyd Ballet by Petit. Subsequently, he joined the San Francisco Ballet as a soloist and was quickly promoted to principal in 2016. During his time with SFB, he worked closely with choreographers  in creation of new works, such as: Forsythe’s Pas/Parts 2016; Thatcher’s Frayed, Painting Greys and Ghost in the Machine; Bubenicek’s Fragile Vessels; Millepied’s The Chairman Dances; Dawson’s Anima Animus; Welch’s Bespoke; Wheeldon’s Bound. In 2020, he joined the Dresden Semperoper Ballett as a principal dancer.

He has been named Best Emerging Artist at the Premio Danza&Danza in 2015 and won The Eleventh International Competition for the Erik Bruhn Prize in Toronto, Canada, in March 2015. He was named Italian Classical Dancer of the Year at Positano Premia la Danza Léonide Massine in Positano, Italy, in September 2014.

He holds a Bachelor of Arts in Performing Arts at Saint Mary's College of California. He now attends the Graduate School of Business at Stanford University.

Repertory

References 

San Francisco Ballet principal dancers
San Francisco Ballet soloists
Italian male dancers
Living people
1993 births